Wheen is a surname. Notable people with the surname include:

Arthur Wesley Wheen (1897–1971), Australian soldier, translator, and museum librarian
Francis Wheen (born 1957), British journalist, writer, and broadcaster
John Gladwell Wheen (died 1929), Methodist minister
Natalie Wheen (born 1947), English writer and radio presenter